K. A. Rajan was a Communist Party of India politician. He was the Member of Parliament from Thrissur Lok Sabha constituency, Kerala, in 1977 and 1980.

References

Politicians from Thrissur
India MPs 1977–1979
India MPs 1980–1984
Lok Sabha members from Kerala
Communist Party of India politicians from Kerala